Kulikovskaya is a rural locality (a village) in Syumskoye Rural Settlement of Shenkursky District, Arkhangelsk Oblast, Russia. The population was 163 as of 2010. There are 10 streets.

Geography 
Kulikovskaya is located 62 km north of Shenkursk (the district's administrative centre) by road. Lekhovskaya is the nearest rural locality.

References 

Rural localities in Shenkursky District
Shenkursky Uyezd